The 2010–11 Macedonian Third Football League was the 19th season of the third-tier football league in the Republic of Macedonia, since its establishment. It began in August 2010 and ended in May 2011.

North

Group A

League table

Group B

League table

Promotion play-off 

|}

Source: MacedonianFootball.com

South

League table

East

League table

West

League table

Southwest

League table

See also
2010–11 Macedonian Football Cup
2010–11 Macedonian First Football League
2010–11 Macedonian Second Football League

References

External links
MacedonianFootball.com
Football Federation of Macedonia 

Macedonia 3
3
Macedonian Third Football League seasons